Perrigo can refer to:
 Perrigo, manufacturer of private label over-the-counter pharmaceuticals in the United States

Perrigo (surname)
 Bert Perrigo (1903 - 1985), British engineer who was a successful motorcycle trials rider before becoming Competition Manager for BSA ...
 Harry Perrigo
 Oscar E. Perrigo (1848 - 1923), American mechanical engineer, and early management author.